Wilco Hellinga (born 16 August 1970 in the Netherlands) is a Dutch retired footballer who last played for SC Veendam in his home country.

Career

Hellinga started his senior career with VV Gorredijk. In 1990, he signed for SC Heerenveen in the Dutch Eredivisie, where he made forty-nine league appearances and scored four goals. After that, he played for St. Gallen, Nürnberg, Zürich, and SC Veendam.

References

External links 
 Wilco Hellinga about Switzerland at the World Cup 
 Wilco Hellinga: The tireless worker 
 "Peeves was quite impressed with how I described Basel"
 Youth coach SC Heerenveen enjoyed in Switzerland: "It feels like coming home" 
 Wilco Hellinga: 'Nice steps taken'

1970 births
Dutch footballers
Association football defenders
Dutch expatriate footballers
Expatriate footballers in Switzerland
Expatriate footballers in Germany
SC Heerenveen players
FC St. Gallen players
1. FC Nürnberg players
FC Zürich players
SC Veendam players
Living people